"Bringin' On the Heartbreak" is a power ballad originally recorded by English rock band Def Leppard. It was the second single from their 1981 album High 'n' Dry. The song was written by three of the band's members: Steve Clark, Pete Willis, and Joe Elliott.

Musical style
"Bringin' On the Heartbreak" is a glam metal, hard rock, and soft rock power ballad.

Record World said that "Joe Elliot's dramatic vocals and the estranged guitar cries plod over a sledge-hammer beat."

Production
High 'n' Dry was released in the U.S. in summer 1981. "Bringin' On the Heartbreak" was commercially released in the U.S. on 13 November, with "Me and My Wine" (a non-album track) and "You Got Me Runnin'" included as B-sides. It did not appear on the U.S. charts, but its music video was picked up by the recently launched television channel MTV and received heavy rotation. The popularity of the video and the exposure the band received caused a resurgence in sales of High 'n' Dry, which subsequently sold over two million copies. It was released in Mexico as "Llevarlo en la Desilusión" with "Yo y mi Vino" ("Me and My Wine"), featuring the cover art from the single "Too Late for Love".

High 'n' Dry was re-issued in May 1984 with two new tracks, one of which was a synthesizer-heavy remix of "Bringin' On the Heartbreak". With a newly-filmed video featuring Phil Collen on guitar, the remix was released as a single and peaked at 61 on the U.S. Billboard Hot 100. The original version of the song was later included on three of their compilation albums: Vault: Def Leppard Greatest Hits (1980–1995) (1995) Best of Def Leppard (2004) and Rock of Ages: The Definitive Collection (2005). The latter compilation ends with the instrumental "Switch 625", as it does in High 'n' Dry. Steve Huey of AllMusic has characterised the song as an "unabashedly dramatic rock ballad."

Music video
The first music video was directed by Doug Smith, and is a live recording of Def Leppard performing the song at the Royal Court Theatre in Liverpool, England on 22 July 1981. It was originally filmed (along with clips for "Let It Go" and "High 'n' Dry") as part of Don Kirshner's Rock Concert television series on the U.S. network ABC. The second music video, directed by David Mallet, was shot in February 1984 in Jacob's Biscuit Factory in Lake, Dublin, Ireland and features replacement guitarist Phil Collen playing Pete Willis's part. The original version of the second video featuring the remix is only available on the VHS and LaserDisc versions of the band's video compilation release Historia. DVD reissues of Historia, and the band's subsequent video compilations Best of the Videos and Rock of Ages - The DVD Collection replace the remix soundtrack with the original High 'n' Dry LP recording.

Track listing
7" Mercury / 818 779-7 (U.S.)
 "Bringin' On the Heartbreak" (remix)
 "Me & My Wine" (remix)

Personnel 

 Joe Elliott - lead vocals
 Steve Clark - lead guitar
 Pete Willis - rhythm guitar
 Rick Savage - bass, backing vocals
 Rick Allen - drums

Charts

Mariah Carey version

Background and composition
In 2002, the song was covered by American singer and songwriter Mariah Carey for her album Charmbracelet (2002). The reaction from Def Leppard's Joe Elliott was positive.

Carey co-produced her cover of the song with Randy Jackson. The single version also featured a newly recorded solo and extra guitar overdubs performed by Dave Navarro. One of Carey's few songs with a heavy rock influence, it was released as the album's third and final single on June 2, 2003, by Island Def Jam and her own label, MonarC. It was also the final single from MonarC before she shut it down in 2004.

Critical reception
The cover was met with positive reviews from a variety of critics.  Rolling Stone described the song as "the catchiest cut [on Charmbracelet]...a fascinatingly overblown orchestral remake." Phil Collen praised Carey's cover as a "genuine version of our song" and defended it from Def Leppard's more critical fans: "The fans really get it wrong sometimes. She's on our side and it's an honour she's done it. Really, that's the only way we're getting played." Carey's version was number 24 on VH1's "Least Metal Moments"—in a segment subtitled "Bringin' On the Headache"—because many metal fans and musicians did not like the remake. At the same time, Mark Edward Nero of About.com ranked it at number 2 on his list of "Top 5 R&B/Pop Crossover Cover Songs" and said Carey's version is "superior to the original."
Asked about Carey's cover version, Joe Elliott told the Las Vegas Sun, "I think she's done a very good job. It's faithful to the arrangement, but not done like a rock song." Referring to Carey's whistle register vocals at the end, Elliott commented that her "astonishing vocal gymnastics toward the end...make Minnie Riperton sound like Tom Waits." Billboard was favorable by naming it "set's crowning glory." The New York Times also reviewed this song favorably: "Another high point is her version of the Def Leppard song Bringin' On the Heartbreak. It starts out as a piano-driven slow jam; then the chorus is interrupted by a dramatic chord progression, and soon Ms. Carey's precise, fluttery voice is turning a power ballad into something more delicate." Sal Cinquemani from Slant Magazine called this cover "daring" and praised its "surprising amount of live instrumentation, which contributes to an overall sense of warmth that's been otherwise missing from Carey's recent work." Rich Juzwiak of Stylus called Mariah's version of the song "epic." In the exception of AllMusic, who gave mixed reviews, stated that its best song on album but also noting that it "isn't even covered all that well."

Chart performance
Similar to the commercial performance of "Boy (I Need You)", the album's second single, "Bringin' On the Heartbreak" failed to enter the US Billboard Hot 100, or the Bubbling Under Hot 100 Singles chart. It reached the top-thirty in Switzerland, and the top-forty in Belgium; but peaked outside the top-forty in Austria. Junior Vasquez, Mike Rizzo and Ruanne produced club remixes of the song, which received a wider release on promotional singles than commercial singles and received spins in nightclubs worldwide—the song reached the top five on the US Billboard Hot Dance Club Play.

Promotion
The song's video, set to the RJ Janman remix, was shot in Los Angeles on 8 March 2003 by director Sanaa Hamri, and features cameo appearances by Randy Jackson, Dave Navarro, Evan Marriott (as a helicopter pilot/bodyguard) and model Damon Willis. The single's video is based on the 1979 film The Rose, which featured a rock star (played by Bette Midler) who struggles to find happiness as she goes from her rough "rock and roll" lifestyle to her final high-profile concert.

On 7 December 2002, Carey performed the song along with "Through the Rain" and "My All" in front of a crowd of 50,000 people, at the closing concert of the Mexican Teletón, which took place in the country's Azteca Stadium. Announced as the concert's "star", she performed in a black dress.

Track listing and formats

 European CD single

 "Bringin' On the Heartbreak (Mainstream Version)" – 4:13
 "Miss You" (feat. Jadakiss) – 5:09

 European enhanced CD single

 "Bringin' On the Heartbreak (Mainstream Version)" – 4:13
 "Miss You" (feat. Jadakiss) – 5:09
 "Bringin' On the Heartbreak" (Live) – 4:52
 "Bringin' On the Heartbreak" (Video)

 Bringin' On the Heartbreak EP

 "Bringin' On the Heartbreak" (Mainstream Version) – 4:11
 "Bringin' On the Heartbreak" (Mainstream AC Version) – 4:11
 "Bringin' On the Heartbreak" (Live) – 4:49
 "Bringin' On the Heartbreak" (Global Soul Club Mix) – 8:35
 "Bringin' On the Heartbreak" (Global Soul Dub) – 7:33
 "Bringin' On the Heartbreak" (Global Soul Mix Show) – 7:44
 "Bringin' On the Heartbreak" (Global Soul Radio Edit) – 4:27
 "Bringin' On the Heartbreak" (Junior Vasquez Club Mix) – 7:14
 "Bringin' On the Heartbreak" (Junior Vasquez Extended Mix) – 9:45
 "Bringin' On the Heartbreak" (Junior Vasquez Radio Edit) – 3:56
 "Bringin' On the Heartbreak" (Junior Vasquez Mix Show) – 6:28
 "Bringin' On the Heartbreak" (Ruanne Emmenes Coffee Dub) – 6:11
 "Bringin' On the Heartbreak" (Ruanne Emmenes Vocal Capture Mix) – 8:47

Remixes

Global Soul Mixes
"Bringin' On The Heartbreak" (Global Soul Club Mix) – 8:30
"Bringin' On The Heartbreak" (Global Soul Mix Show) – 7:38
"Bringin' On The Heartbreak" (Global Soul Dub) – 7:30
"Bringin' On The Heartbreak" (Global Soul Radio Edit) – 4:53
Junior Vasquez Mixes
"Bringin' On The Heartbreak" (Junior Vasquez Club Mix) – 7:11
"Bringin' On The Heartbreak" (Junior Vasquez Extended Mix) – 9:45
"Bringin' On The Heartbreak" (Junior Vasquez Radio Edit) – 3:54 
Ruanne Emmenes Mixes
"Bringin' On The Heartbreak" (Ruanne Emmenes Vocal Capture Mix) – 8:45
"Bringin' On The Heartbreak" (Ruanne's Roasted Coffee Dub) – 6:11
Deep Influence Mixes
"Bringin' On The Heartbreak" (Deep Influence Anthem) – 11:29
"Bringin' On The Heartbreak" (Deep Influence Radio) – 4:23

Charts

Release history

See also
List of glam metal albums and songs

References

·

1981 singles
1984 singles
2003 singles
Def Leppard songs
Mariah Carey songs
Music videos directed by Sanaa Hamri
1980s ballads
2000s ballads
Song recordings produced by Robert John "Mutt" Lange
1981 songs
Songs written by Steve Clark
Songs written by Joe Elliott
Songs written by Pete Willis
Mercury Records singles
Island Records singles
Glam metal ballads
Hard rock ballads
Songs about heartache
Music videos directed by David Mallet (director)